Gimonäs CK is a Swedish cycling and football club located in Gimonäs in Umeå. The club, formed in 1934, currently has no men's football section as it was disbanded after the 2005 season.

External links 
 Gimonäs CK - official site

Defunct football clubs in Sweden
Sport in Västerbotten County
Association football clubs established in 1934
Association football clubs disestablished in 2005
1934 establishments in Sweden
2005 disestablishments in Sweden